The Toyota MR2 is a line of two-seat, mid-engined, rear-wheel-drive sports cars manufactured in Japan and marketed globally by Toyota from 1984 until 2007 over three generations: W10 (1984–1989), W20 (1989–1999) and W30 (1999–2007). It is Japan's first rear mid-engined production car.

Conceived as a small, economical and sporty car, the MR2 employed straightforward design elements, including fully independent MacPherson strut front and rear suspensions, four-wheel disc brakes, and a transverse-mounted inline-four engine.

The name MR2 stands for either "mid-ship run-about 2-seater" or "mid-engine, rear-wheel-drive, 2-seater". In French-speaking markets, the vehicle was renamed Toyota MR because the abbreviation "MR2" sounds like the profanity "merde" when spoken in French.

Origins
The MR2 derived from a 1976 Toyota design project with the goal of a car which would be enjoyable to drive, yet still provide good fuel economy – not necessarily a sports car. Design work began in 1979 when Akio Yoshida from Toyota's testing department started to evaluate alternatives for engine placement and drive method, finalizing a mid-transverse engine placement. Toyota called the 1981 prototype SA-X.

From its original design, the car evolved into a sports car, and further prototypes were tested both in Japan and in the US. Significant testing was performed on race circuits including Willow Springs, where former Formula One driver Dan Gurney tested the car.

All three generations were in compliance with Japanese government regulations concerning exterior dimensions and engine displacement. The MR2 appeared around the same time as the Honda CR-X and the Nissan EXA from Japan, the Pontiac Fiero and Ford EXP from North America, and about a decade after the VW Scirocco and Fiat X1/9 from Europe made their debut.

Toyota debuted its SV-3 concept car in October 1983 at the Tokyo Motor Show, gathering press and audience publicity. The car was scheduled for a Japanese launch in the second quarter of 1984 under the name MR2.

First generation (W10; 1984–1989)

Toyota introduced the first-generation MR2 in 1984, designating it the model code "W10". When fitted with the 1.5-liter 3A engine, it was known as the "AW10". Likewise, the 1.6-liter 4A version is identified by the "AW11" code.

In Japan, the MR2 was marketed exclusively via Toyota's Toyota Auto Store and Toyota Vista Store, both rebranded in 1998 as Netz Toyota Store. At its introduction in 1984, the MR2 won the Car of the Year Japan.

The car is often referred to as the AW11, referring to the chassis code of the most common 1.6-liter, A-engined versions.

The MR2's suspension and handling were designed by Toyota with the help of Lotus engineer Roger Becker. Toyota's cooperation with Lotus during the prototype phase can be seen in the AW11, and it owes much to Lotus's sports cars of the 1960s and 1970s. Toyota's active suspension technology, called TEMS, was not installed. With five structural bulkheads, the MR2 was quite heavy for a two-seater of its size.

Toyota employed the naturally aspirated 4A-GE  inline-four engine, a DOHC four-valve-per-cylinder motor, borrowed from the E80 series Corolla. A five-speed manual transmission was standard, with a four-speed automatic available as an option.

Road tests delivered 0– times in the mid- to high-8 second range and  times in the mid- to high-16 second range, significantly faster than the four-cylinder Pontiac Fiero or Fiat X1/9.

In 1986 (1988 for the US market), Toyota introduced a supercharged engine for the MR2. Based on the same block and head, the 4A-GZE was equipped with a small Roots-type supercharger and a Denso intercooler. T-VIS was eliminated and the compression ratio was lowered to 8:1. The supercharger was belt-driven but actuated by an electromagnetic clutch, so that it would not be driven except when needed, increasing fuel economy. A fuel selector switch was also added in some markets, to allow the car to run on regular unleaded fuel if required. In addition to the new engine, the MR2 SC was also equipped with stiffer springs, and received special "tear-drop" aluminum wheels. The engine cover had two raised vents (only one of which was functional) that visually distinguished it from the naturally aspirated models. It was also labeled "SUPER CHARGER" on the rear trunk and body mouldings behind both doors. This model was never offered outside of the Japanese and North American markets, although some cars were privately imported to other countries.

Yearly changes

MK1a and MK1b are unofficial designations, but are frequently used by owners and vendors to distinguish between early production vehicles and later face-lifted models. While there are considerable differences detailed below, the most notable being that rear suspension components are not interchangeable between the MK1a and MK1b cars.

MK1a – June 1984 (MY 1985)
Original introduction

June 1985 (MY 1986)

Japanese model changes:
Supercharged model introduced, offered with four-speed A/T or five-speed M/T
T-bar roof option available
Color-keyed front lip and bumpers, side stripes, mudflaps, side skirts option now available
Mudflap removed for models equipped with "Aerodynamic Spoiler Package" as the side skirts are full-length along the side
Rear sunshade with TOYOTA logo above rear window added
Third brake light added
Leather interior option now available
Bigger 212 mm flywheel and clutch for naturally aspirated models
Rear anti-roll bar discontinued on North American models

MK1b Facelift – August 1986 (MY 1987)

Powertrain changes:
Naturally aspirated 4A-GE now upgraded with a "7-rib" structural design as well as larger  connecting rods.
Intake camshaft valve cover now has the "16 Valve" portion in red instead of blue (this is not to be confused with the smallport third generation 4A-GE where the intake camshaft cover lettering has the entire "Twin Cam 16 Valve" in red)
EGR port repositioned on exhaust manifold to prevent cracking
Revised manual transmission internals.
Air filter rerouted to the trunk and continues around the trunk towards the air vent on the opposite side of the engine bay.
Chassis changes:
Slight unibody changes
Radiator tilted back at an angle to force air down towards the bottom of the car
Revised rear suspension
Larger  front and  rear brake rotors
New tail lights (UK models retained old tail light design with different integrated reflector)
New front lip and front bumper
Radio antenna moved to rear right quarter panel for t-top/sunroof models
T-bar roof available in North America and Europe
Interior changes:
LHD models now has parking brake on the right side
New center console, center armrest
Glovebox lock
Double-din radio, rear speakers added to the upper C pillar
Door panels, three-spoke steering wheel, gauge cluster markings
Seat changed to single-color velour and perforations added for leather seats

1987 (MY 1988)
Supercharged model available in North America
Color-coded side mirrors and new engine lid for supercharged models
Full-length side skirts now standard on all models

1988 (MY 1989)
T-bar glass panels changed from smoked (clear) to mirrored (opaque)
Color-code door handle and side mirrors for all models
Incandescent third brake lamp replaced by LED strip integrated into the rear spoiler
More aerodynamic wing mirrors introduced, with optional power retract mechanism
North American supercharged models equipped with rear anti-roll bar

The changes in MY 1986 and MY 1987 occurred in parts. Instead of a drastic change in MY 1987 models for the above MK1b upgrades, some MK1a parts continued on in early MY 1987 cars while some MK1b parts came on MY 1986 cars as options. An example is that some MY 1987 cars still retained the old "flat" front bumper despite having MK1b upgrades everywhere else on the car. Some early MY 1987 7-rib engines came with the earlier blue top valve cover. This was also noticed in the rear sway bar removal for the MY 1986. Some MY 1986 cars have a rear sway bar, while the mounting tabs on the strut housing were either there for both sides, only one side, or none at all depending on when Toyota ran out of the older rear struts with mounting tabs as production used up parts.

Reception
American car magazines Road & Track and Car and Driver both chose the MR2 on their "ten best" car lists. The Australian Wheels magazine chose the 1988 MR2 as its favourite sports car. The MR2 was Motor Trends Import Car of the Year for 1985. The MR2 was also on Car and Driver magazine's Ten Best list for 1986 and 1987. In 2004, Sports Car International ranked the MR2 number eight on the list of Top Sports Cars of the 1980s.

In 1988 and 1989 Toyota produced two final production runs of fully optioned "Super Edition" MR2s, based upon the supercharged Japanese market model, and only sold in Japan.  The 1988 'Super Edition' was a run of 300 units, had white/gold two-tone paint, bronze glass, unique half-leather and half-cloth seats, along with a MOMO-commissioned steering wheel and gear knob. The 1989 model, a run of 270 units, featured a special Midnight Blue paint, the MOMO-commissioned steering wheel and gear knob, Recaro "Milano" seats with matching door panels. The 1989 model also benefited from some of the last G-Limited model options, such as the LED rear spoiler brake light and more aerodynamic wing mirrors.  Both "Super Edition" models had unique decals on the rear visor and side stripes.

 Motorsport(W10)
 Toyota 222D rally car 
While Toyota's front-engine, rear-drive Celica rally cars proved dominant in the African Group B rallies of the 1980s, they were at a disadvantage on the twistier European stages. Thus, Toyota Team Europe started a rally project in 1985, codenamed "222D" based on the MR2, for competition in Group S and potentially Group B. Though somewhat similar on the outside, it is clear that the prototype had very little in common with the production car although the two appear to share the same factory AW11 floor pan. Little else is known about the project as it never competed. With Group B cancelled in 1986, the proposed Group S regulations suffered the same fate, and the remaining prototypes were reduced to museum pieces and private collections. Supposedly eleven prototypes were made, of which eight were destroyed during testing, leaving only three known examples: Two in black, one stored at Toyota Gazoo's facility in Cologne and one sold to a private collector in 2017, one in white, with a 50mm lengthened wheelbase and a more production styled body located in Tokyo.

Although the 222D was still a prototype, it made it very far into development before Group B was canceled. Of the rumored eleven built, eight were destroyed in testing, indicating Toyota was considering bringing the 222D to competition. However, the short wheelbase proved to be a challenge during testing, as the 222D also suffered from enormous turbo lag (as did most of the competitive Group B cars), but paired with the extremely short wheel base made driving at speed almost impossible.Toyota Team Europe owner Ove Anderson describes: "you never knew what it was going to do. With such a short wheelbase and such power in such a light car it could swap ends at any time, and without any warning".

During a surprise appearance at the 2006 Goodwood Festival of Speed, Toyota drove and displayed a black 222D.

 Second generation (W20; 1989–1999)

The MR2 went through a redesign in 1989 (though North America did not receive them until early 1990 as 1991 models). The new car was larger, weighed  more than its predecessor due to having a more luxurious and spacious cabin, larger engine sizes, sturdier transaxle, and a more durable suspension setup. The overall design of the automobile received more rounded, streamlined styling, with some calling the MR2 SW20 a "baby Ferrari" or "poor man's Ferrari" due to design cues similar to the Ferrari 308 GTB/GTS or Ferrari 348.

Like the AW11 before it, Toyota spent countless hours fine-tuning the handling capabilities of the SW20, seeking advice from professional race car drivers, including Dan Gurney of Formula One, NASCAR, and Le Mans fame.

When the AW11 was still in production and before the SW20 was officially shown to the public, several rumors were spreading stating that Toyota was building yet another mid-engine sports car, one that would have a 3.0L V6 engine that could directly compete with the 348, though this specific rumor was later shot down under the pretense that such a car would belong under the Lexus branding.Japanese market trim levels:G with an NA 2.0L 3S-GE engine producing ; with an A/T standard and an optional M/T. The G was the base model of the SW20 line-up. Standard features included: manual steering, manual climate control but no air conditioning, electric mirror adjustment but manual folding, and fabric door/seat trim. The rear spoiler was optional.G-Limited with the NA 2.0L 3S-GE engine; an A/T was standard or an M/T was optional. The G-Limited was the higher-specification naturally aspirated SW20. Additional standard features: electric folding mirrors, power steering, steering fog lamps, and rear spoiler.GT-S with a turbocharged 2.0L 3S-GTE engine producing ; an M/T was the only choice. The GT-S had the same standard features as the G-Limited.GT with the turbocharged 2.0L 3S-GTE engine and manual transmission. The GT was considered as the luxury specification in the SW20 line-up and had alcantera/leather door and seat trim in addition to G-Limited standard features. All Japanese market cars came equipped with electronic climate control featuring 2 stage air conditioning.European market trim levels:Coupe with the NA 2.0L 3S-FE engine producing  (not available with T-bar roof). This model had no rear spoiler or front fog lightsGT-i Coupe with the NA 2.0L 3S-GE engine producing .GT-i T-Bar with the NA 2.0L 3S-GE engine. Options included as standard were full leather seats/door cards and the premium 8 speaker audio system.

Differences between the normally aspirated and turbocharged models include the "Turbo" emblem (US) on the rear trunk, 'TWIN CAM 16 TURBO' decal above the side intake (Japanese market), a fiberglass engine lid with raised vents, fog lights, and an added interior center storage compartment located between the two seats. All SW20 MR2s came with a staggered wheel setup, with wider wheels and tires in the rear than in the front.

Mechanical differences on the Turbo models include:
3S-GTE engine with associated air-to-air intercooler and different exhaust configuration;
Stronger and heavier E153 gearbox with different ratios and stronger axles;
Larger fuel pump and radiator.
Models with 3S-GE and 3S-GTE engines had twin-piston front brake calipers. Models with the 5S-FE engine had only single-piston calipers.

The Revision 1 Turbo SW20 can pull 0.89g at the skidpad, with later revisions averaging 0.90g – 0.94.

Revision 2 cars were fitted with Yokohama A022s; coincidentally, the Honda NSX also uses a special variant of the A022.

A stock Japanese market Rev 3 GT-S Turbo was able to run the 1/4 mile in 13.1 seconds, beating out more expensive and higher powered automobiles such as the Honda NSX, Toyota Supra RZ, and even the Ferrari 348 TB.

Best Motoring, a popular Japanese automobile TV show, featured an episode that had them battle a factory stock Rev 5 GT-S Turbo versus other Japanese market contemporaries on the Tsukuba Circuit, with the MR2 winning the circuit race. In the rankings of personal bests, a Rev 2 GT-S was able to clock 1:08.00 at Tsukuba Circuit.

Revisions and model year changes
The second-generation MR2 underwent a variety of changes during its 10 years of production, grouped in four different periods:

1989 (Revision 1)
Introduction of the new generation.

January 1992 (Revision 2, MY 1993)

Revised rear suspension with longer toe links
Revised front suspension which removed castor angle adjustment
Larger front lip
15-inch wheels and wider tires on all models (Front: 195/55/15, Rear: 225/50/15)
Larger brakes (turbo only in US market, All cars for Japanese and European markets)
Shorter shift lever and smaller knob
Viscous LSD option (turbo only)
Upgraded transmission synchronizers
US turbo models now only sold with T-bar roof (except for a few sold in early 1993)
Canadian sales cease after 1993
EBFD and TC added as options on Japanese market models

November 1993 (Revision 3, MY 1994–1995)

European & Japanese market 3S-GE now rated at 173 hp
Japanese market 3S-GTE (Gen 3) now rated at 
American market Turbo models retained the Gen 2 3S-GTE.
Round "Kouki" tail lights
Prior 3-piece rear wing replaced with revised one-piece
Color-coded center panel, front lip, and side skirts.
Passenger airbag (not available for the Japanese market)
Viscous LSD added as standard in Japanese market Turbo models
Japanese market E153 gearbox revised with upgraded synchros
Cruise control no longer an option on Japanese market models
Upgrades made to ABS system, which now induced an acceleration sensor located behind the gear stick
Upgrades to electronic power steering system (EHPS) to boost assist at low speeds and reduce assist at high speeds
Strengthening pieces added to rear strut towers
American sales cease in 1995; turbo models are not offered in California-emission states after 1994

June 1996 (Revision 4, MY 1996–1997)
Fender mounted turn signals on all models
5-spoke alloy wheels featured diamond cut faces
Passenger airbag added as an option in Japanese market
Revisions to ABS system
European 3S-GE down-rated to 168 hp due to the introduction of EGR.
Unavailable in North AmericaRevision 5 : 1998–1999 Model (Introduced Nov-1997):Clear fender mounted turn signals
New 15-inch wheels featuring narrower spokes
Adjustable rear spoiler, revised from the earlier versions
Red rings around gauges, red stitching on leather shift knob (and on leather seats on turbos)
Japan receives the new BEAMS 3S-GE rated at 

Changes to the suspension geometry, tire sizes and power steering in January 1992 (MY 1993) were made in response to journalist reports that the MR2 was prone to "snap-oversteer". As a counterpoint to the snap-oversteer phenomenon of the MR2, other journalists point out that most mid-engine and rear engine sports and super cars exhibit similar behaviour, and that a change to the driver's response to oversteer is really the solution. In any car, braking shifts the weight forward, and acceleration to the rear. When drivers enter a corner with too much speed, and lift the throttle mid-corner, the weight transfers forward causing the rear tires to lose traction (called lift-off oversteer), which can result in a spin. When improper steering inputs were made attempting to correct this non-power-on oversteer, the rear of the MR2 would swing one way, then wildly (and quickly) the other—thus the term "snap" oversteer. Toyota elected to change the MR2 suspension and tires to reduce the likelihood that this would occur, though many drivers would lament the change and claim that it "neutered" the sharp edge the MR2 was known for. Toyota claimed that the changes were made "for drivers whose reflexes were not those of Formula One drivers".

Special variants

TRD2000GT

In 1998, Toyota Racing Development offered an official kit body conversion and tuning program for MR2 owners to transform their existing SW20 MR2 into a wide-body TRD2000GT replica car. This was to pay homage to the TRD2000GT wins in the GT-C Japanese racing series, since the TRD2000GT racing series cars were based on the SW20 floor pan. Prior to MR2s being fitted with the TRD2000GT body kit, TRD had its customers select which additional engine, suspension, wheel, and interior upgrades they wanted. For this reason, no two TRD2000GT MR2s are alike. It is rumored that at least one was built to produce up to  whereas some others had few modifications to their engines.

In order to ensure exclusivity, a high price tag was charged and total of just 35 factory car conversions were completed by Toyota Technocraft Ltd. Each official Technocraft-converted car was made using lightweight fiberglass components (front fenders, trunk lid extension, rear quarter panels, gas door, front and rear bumpers, 3-piece wing) and re-classified as completely new cars (with their own specially numbered TRD VIN plate riveted to the body to indicate their authenticity and rarity).

The Toyota Technocraft Ltd. TRD2000GT had a  wider front and rear track (due to the addition of wider wheels and tires). Virtually every car converted also had other TRD parts fitted too, including extensive changes to both the suspension and engine. While TRD Japan only offered a small number of kits with all body parts required for third-party conversion, Toyota Technocraft Ltd. offered complete car conversions.

Apart from the cars listed on the TRD2000GT register it is unknown how many original Toyota Technocraft Ltd. cars still exist today, but it is rumored that approximately 10 conversion kits were imported from TRD Japan into the US for conversions. In many respects, the extended body can be compared to that of a Porsche 911 Slantnose modification. The car's width is extended and body dimensions dramatically changing the car's overall visuals. Very little is known about these cars outside Japan.

TOM'S T020

Apart from Toyota Racing Development, TOM'S also released official body kits and a variety of tuning parts for the MR2. The "T020" as it was called, was powered by a naturally aspirated 2.2L stroked 3S-GE that produced  at 6,800 rpm, this was due to more aggressive "F3" cams, a stroker kit, better intake flow with the aid of the "TOM'S Hyper Induction Carbon" intake kit, and an upgraded exhaust system labeled the "TOM'S Barrel", a lightened flywheel was also equipped to help the engine rev easier. The T020 also featured a more race-oriented suspension/chassis set up via camber kits, upgraded tie-rods, strut bars, roll center adjusters, stiffer springs, race shock absorbers, and sports brake pads. A sportier look was given to the vehicle as well through engine scoops, side skirts, a Ferrari 348-esque rear light grille, forged wheels, revised bumper designs, and a larger rear spoiler.

Though undeniably still an MR2, the T020 was in all essence a more refined automobile, as is the nature of any TOM'S outfitted vehicle. Whilst the T020 was a normally aspirated vehicle, TOM'S also produced equipment for turbocharged models — e.g. wastegates, boost controllers, air filters, a 3S-GTE version of their "TOM'S Barrel" exhaust system, and  "T.E.C. II" Engine Control Units. Despite the fact that these products are no longer purchasable brand new, some of these modification parts may still be procured as second-hand items, and are highly sought after by the MR2 community. TOM'S still keeps a T020 part list on their website, and there are still T020 part catalogues in circulation between enthusiasts to this day, albeit second-hand.

SW20 Spider
Between 1996 and 1999, Toyota TechnoCraft (TTC) produced 91 MKII SW20 MR2 Spiders. These cars featured a retractable, cloth softtop roof, wingless trunk lid, and an engine lid that was unique to the SW20 spider. Most of these cars were automatics and nearly all of them sported a naturally aspirated engine. Toyota decided against putting its name or logo on these cars as a result of its desire to distance itself from cars that featured leaky roofs. Most of the Spiders came in Lucerne Silver with a blue side moulding and featured black and blue accented cloth seats.

Several of these cars have been imported into the UK.

 Aftermarket 
During its production, the SW20 enjoyed a myriad of tuning parts from Japanese tuners such as HKS, Blitz, Phoenix Power, etc. While some companies only offered aesthetic modifications for the SW20, others such as Phoenix Power offered modifications such as a tuned ECU, longblock modifications, and a trunk-mounted intercooler combined with a T04R Turbocharger. The Phoenix Power MR2 also featured a large rear wing reminiscent of the 911 (993) GT2 for increased downforce at high speeds, and a reworked suspension set up with Öhlins equipment. Japanese tuner Border Racing, made available several parts as well, consisting mostly of parts that improved the car's suspension geometry, namely roll-center adapters, extended tie rods, etc., though they have also produced intercooler kits for the car and several interior pieces. AP Racing at a time also produced a brake kit as well for the MR2, but this has been discontinued. Performance parts manufacturer JUN offered engine upgrades for the MR2's 3S-GTE engine which came in the form of stroker kits, which were co-developed with Cosworth, and also offered lightened flywheels, cam gears, and camshafts.

 Reception 
The SW20 garnered generally favorable reviews during its production life, with various sources complimenting the styling, power, and responsive handling. Car and Driver noted the revised SW20's braking capabilities to be superb, stating that 70 mph to standstill could be done in 157 feet, rivaling that of the Honda NSX. Former Top Gear host and racing driver Tiff Needell commends the SW20's handling having said that it "encourages you to drive with enthusiasm" in a review back in 1990. He does note however, that the sudden transition from understeer to oversteer may be startling for some people.

The car is infamously known for its "snap-oversteer" phenomenon. This notoriety comes from numerous instances where individuals crash their SW20s either on or off the race track due to inexperience with a mid-ship platform, as MR layouts handle very differently in comparison to the more common FF or even FR layouts. Even in its revised state from January 1992, the SW20 still has a large enough following to be labeled as a very challenging car to push to its limits, with some labeling it as "the most dangerous car that you can buy". Such a label may be true as MR2s are relatively cheaper than most automobiles with an MR platform (Honda NSX, Ferrari F355, Lotus Elise) and that it is readily available to most people.

 In popular culture 

The 1997 PlayStation video game Gran Turismo featured the MR2 SW20 alongside other 1990s Japanese market cars such as the Honda NSX, Mitsubishi FTO and Nissan Skyline. Its 1999 sequel Gran Turismo 2 introduced other variants of the MR2, including the TOM'S T020, the TRD2000GT, and the MOMOCORSE MR2 JGTC.

 Motorsport (W20)

Early in the 1990s, the SW20 enjoyed considerable success throughout the world. Several teams fielded the MR2 in the Swiss Touring Car Championship, as well as in the South-East Asian Supercar Championship, with much success. The chassis was also used for a time during the mid 90s in the Fuji Freshman Series in Japan in which the SW20 succeeded the earlier AE86 chassis. , both the SW20 and ZZW30 chassis are used in 750 Motor Club's MR2 Championship in the UK which started in the early 2000s.

 SARD MC8-R 

SARD (Sigma Advanced Research Development) built a heavily-modified and lengthened version of the SW20 for GT racing called the SARD MC8-R. It used a heavily-modified MR2 frontal chassis with a custom rear chassis made to fit a twin-turbo version of the 4.0-liter 1UZ-FE V8 producing . This is the first car which only used the frontal chassis of a production car and was effectively a purpose-built semi-sports-prototype that successfully got GT1 homologation. The overall construction method of this car (a heavily-modified production car frontal chassis with race-built rear chassis combined into a style of semi-prototype) inspired Porsche to make 911 GT1 homologation specials which dominates the GT1, and foreshadowed the cancellation of GT1.

 Japanese Grand Touring Championship (now Super GT) 
With JGTC being the highest form of sports car racing in Japan, many manufacturers and private teams alike spent countless hours of research and development into perfecting their respective chassis. Toyota would enter their premier production cars, namely the Celica, MR2, and Supra. Unlike the experimental MC8-R, the MR2 JGTC shared more qualities chassis wise to the road-going production car, though it had a lower ride height than the standard SW20s, was wider, featured advanced aerodynamics and Brembo racing brakes. While it kept the MacPherson suspension setup from the road car, these components too were heavily modified (strut towers were more inward). The standard E153 5-speed transmission was swapped out for a race sequential transmission, which was mated to a race-spec version of the 3S-GTE engine. With the car's interior gutted, the intercooler was placed in the forward section of the vehicle with pipes travelling to and fro inside the cabin, as opposed to in the engine bay as a "side-mount" in production MR2s. Having won back to back in the years 1998 to 1999 against arguably more sophisticated race cars such as the BMW M3, Porsche 911, Ferrari F355, Toyota has proven that the SW20 chassis was competitive enough for top level sports car racing.1998Team Taisan Jr. with Tsuchiya campaigned a MR2 #25 powered by the factory 3S-GTE powerplant in the 1998 JGTC season. Keiichi Suzuki and Shingo Tachi drove an amazing five GT300 victories out of six races (as the Fuji Speedway race was cancelled due to inclement weather and several accidents), winning the teams' and drivers' championship for GT300 accumulating a total of 106 points. Their #25 MR2 also participated and won the "All-Star race" at the end of the year.1999For following year, Team Taisan Jr. moved to a Porsche chassis in GT300, while MOMOCORSE A'PEX Racing Team with Tsuchiya campaigned a crimson MR2 and won both teams' and drivers' championships. Morio Nitta and Shinichi Takagi drove to one victory, two 2nd places, and one third place to secure the teams' championship, with Nitta winning the drivers' championship by just one point over the Nismo Silvia that was driven by Takeshi Tsuchiya and Yuji Ide. Momocorse Racing would move to the MR-S chassis for the 2000 season, marking the end of the SW20's participation in JGTC.

 Land speed record 
The car posted  on the two opposing runs required for the record.

The car ran with its stock body apart minus wing mirrors and wiper blades. His attempt at improving his record the following year was thwarted by poor weather.

, the G/BGT record (Class G, Blown Grand Touring Sports or 2 Liter production turbo-charged GT) still stands.

 Third generation (W30; 1999–2007)

The third-generation MR2 was marketed as the Toyota MR-S in Japan, Toyota MR2 Spyder in the US, and the Toyota MR2 Roadster in Europe, except for France and Belgium, where it was marketed as the Toyota MR Roadster.

Also known as the Midship Runabout-Sports, the newest MR2 took a different approach than its predecessor, most obviously becoming a convertible and receiving the 'Spyder' marketing nomenclature.

The first prototype of MR-S appeared in 1997 at the Tokyo Motor Show. The MR2 Spyder chief engineer Harunori Shiratori said, "First, we wanted true driver enjoyment, blending good movement, low inertia, and lightweight. Then, a long wheelbase to achieve high stability and fresh new styling; a mid-engine design to create excellent handling and steering without the weight of the engine upfront; a body structure as simple as possible to allow for easy customizing, and low cost to the consumer."

The only engine available for the ZZW30 was the all-aluminum alloy 1ZZ-FED, a  inline-four engine. Like its predecessors, it used DOHC and 4 valves per cylinder. The intake camshaft timing was adjustable via the VVT-i system, which was introduced earlier on the 1998 MR2 in some markets. Unlike its predecessors, however, the engine was placed onto the car the other way round, with the exhaust manifold towards the rear of the car instead of towards the front.

In addition to the 5-speed manual transmission, a 6-speed manual and 5-speed SMT were made available starting in 2002. A form of automated manual transmission, the SMT has no conventional H-pattern shift lever nor clutch pedal. The driver shifts gears by tapping the shift lever forward or backward or by pressing steering-wheel-mounted buttons. Clutch engagement is automated, and the system modulates the throttle on downshifts, matching engine speed to transmission speed seamlessly. The system prioritizes clutch life over shift speed, hence shifts and launches are slower and gentler than those a human driver can perform using a conventional manual transmission, hindering rapid acceleration somewhat. Unlike similar systems offered in contemporary sports cars, the SMT lacks a fully automated mode emulating an automatic transmission. The SMT automatically shifts to second and then first gear when stopping. The SMT was a standard feature in the Australian market; however, air conditioning was optional. After 2003, a 6-speed SMT was an option. Cruise control was never offered with the manual transmission but was standard for SMT-equipped cars.  Some collectors prefer the SMT over the standard 5-speed manual transmission because in top gear the SMT spins at 2,780 rpm instead of 3,000 rpm for the 5-speed manual at  – making it slightly quieter and giving better economy, even with the extra weight. The drawback to the SMT is slower acceleration and very few technicians actually understand the more complex system.

The MR2 Spyder featured a heated glass rear window. A hardtop was also available from Toyota in Japan and Europe.

Yearly changes
October 1999 (MY 2000)
The MR-S was introduced in October 1999 to the Japanese market in three trim levels: the "B", the "Standard", and the "S". The "S" trim level included power windows, locks, mirrors, AM/FM/CD radio, cloth seats, tilt steering wheel, and alloy wheels.

In March 2000, the car was introduced into the United States and Europe as a "monospec" level, which included the same features as Japan's "S" trim level. In October 2000 the car was introduced in Australia as a 5-speed SMT only.

2001 (MY 2002)
5-speed SMT introduced in the US.

2002 (MY 2003)
New paint colors
New front and rear fascias, standard fog lights, power antennae, and color-matched side air intakes
16-inch rear wheels with larger tires
New seats, slight changes to the gauge cluster and interior
SMT now has six forward gears and faster shifting
New springs, dampers, and a new underbody brace

2003 (MY 2004)

Torsen (helical) limited-slip differential available as an option (C65-01B transmission)
Strengthened unibody for crash intrusion protection (resulting in  greater curb weight)
Ride height increased approximately 1 inch in all markets

2004 (MY 2005)
6-disc in-dash CD player standard
Last year of sales in North America

2006 (MY 2007)
Last year of sales
Special "V-Edition" and "TF300" editions sold only in the United Kingdom.
Some of Final Edition have Burgundy soft top.

Performance and handling

The feedback for the new model was somewhat mixed. Some liked its new design concept, while fans of the SW20 would've liked it to continue along the path of the previous model. All agreed, however, that the ZZW30 had nearly perfect handling. The ZZW30 is considered to be the best-handling MR2 in both overall limit and controllability. For example, Tiff Needell, a very experienced race driver and the former host of the BBC television series Top Gear, praised the handling of the ZZW30. Although some complained of the relative lack of power, many owners have opted to switch out the 1ZZ-FE engine in exchange for the  2ZZ-GE.

Productions numbers
These are the MR2 Spyder production numbers (of North American sales figures only).
 2000: 7,233
 2001: 6,750
 2002: 5,109 
 2003: 3,249
 2004: 2,800
 2005: 780
 Total:''' 27,941

The end of the Spyder
In July 2004, Toyota announced that sales of the MR2 (as well as the Celica) would be discontinued in the US at the end of the 2005 model year because of lower sales numbers. The ZZW30 sold 7,233 units in its debut year, falling to just 901 for the 2005 model, for a total of 27,941 through its six years of production in the US. The 2005 model year was the last year of the MR2 in the US. While the MR2 Spyder was not sold after 2005 in the US, it still was offered in Japan, Mexico, and Europe until production of the car ceased permanently in July 2007.

Special variants

V-Edition
As a farewell to the MR2, Toyota produced 1000 limited-production V-Edition cars for Japan and the UK. They are distinguished by different color wheels, titanium interior accents, minor body changes, a helical limited-slip differential, and different steering wheel trim.

 TF300 
Also for the model year 2007, the United Kingdom received 300 models in a special numbered TF300 series. A special  turbocharged variant called the TTE Turbo (TTE standing for Toyota Team Europe) was available as a dealer-installed package. This package was also available for fitting to customer MR2s.

VM180 Zagato

The Toyota VM180 Zagato was designed by Zagato, based on the MR-S, and built at Toyota Modelista International for sale in Japan only through the Toyota Vista dealer network. It was first shown on 10 January 2001 in Tokyo and then at the February 2001 Geneva Motor Show. The body panels are attached to the original MR-S chassis, as can be seen by the recess around the door handles. The stock engine was tuned to produce .

 Motorsport (W30)
 Super GT 

Between 2000 and 2008, several teams campaigned the MR-S in Super GT (known as JGTC prior to 2004 season).

In 2002, Morio Nitta and Shinichi Takagi shared the GT300 drivers' championship in the ARTA MR-S.
Team Reckless's MR-S won both drivers' and teams' championships in 2005, driven by Kota Sasaki and Tetsuya Yamano.
For 2007, Kazuya Oshima and Hiroaki Ishiura shared the drivers' championship in the Toy Story APR MR-S, with wins at Okayama and Sepang, but lost the teams' championship by six points to the Mooncraft Shiden prototype racer of team Privée Kenzo Asset Shiden.

 The future 
On March 8, 2017, automotive website and magazine Evo'' revealed that Toyota has expressed a desire for a performance range of cars whose core has been referred to as "the Three Brothers" by Tetsuya Tada, chief of Toyota Gazoo Racing. This includes a lightweight mid-engined sports car, rumored to be a spiritual, if not direct, successor to the MR2.

References

Bibliography

External links
Toyota 75 Years Toyota MR2

1990s cars
2000s cars
Mid-engined cars
Rally cars
Rear mid-engine, rear-wheel-drive vehicles
Roadsters
Sports cars
MR2
Cars introduced in 1984
Cars powered by transverse 4-cylinder engines
Sport compact cars
Cars discontinued in 2007